Winneba is a town and the capital of Effutu Municipal District in Central Region of South Ghana. Winneba has a population of 55,331. The current member of parliament is Alexander Kwamina Afenyo-Markin.

History
From pre-colonial times through the establishment of the British colony the Gold Coast, (Effutu) Winneba served as a port town. Fort Winneba was built here.

The people of Winneba (Efutu) were led by their fearless spiritual leader and warrior, Kwamena Gyarteh Ayirebi-Gyan with the support of a large youthful militia called the Asafo Groups made up of both men and women. He ensured that his people were well protected from external attacks by other migrating families, clans, diseases or want of food.

Industry and culture

The main industries of Winneba are fishing and services. It is known for the Aboakyer deer-hunting festival in Winneba and its New Year fancy dress carnival/masquerading festival. The town has a rich musical tradition and currently boasts of several renowned musical groups in the country, including the Winneba Youth Choir, the Osimpam Ompeh group, and the Akoo show Choir. Winneba Senior High School is the only major public secondary cycle educational institute available in this town.

The University of Education, Winneba has its three main campus in Winneba (South Campus, Central Campus, North Campus ).

Festivals 

Masquerade festival, popularly known as fancy dress, is held every new year among the people of Winneba. Its attracts a large number of tourists around the world. It is the second most popular festival in Winneba. The festival is held on a football park at the North campus of university of education by the five main masquerade groups. They come together and compete amongs themselves to select the winner for the trophy. These groups consists of Nobles as number one, Egya as number two, Atumu as number three and Red Cross  as number four and Royals as number 5.

Aboakyer festival is a bushbuck hunting festival celebrated by the people of Winneba in the Central Region of Ghana. The name Aboakyer translates as 'hunting for game or animal' in Fante dialect as spoken by the people of the Central region. The institution of the festival was to commemorate the migration of the Simpafo (the aboriginal name of the people of Winneba).

The Aboakyer Festival is being celebrated by the people of Effutu, who were among the earliest settlers of Ghana, for uncountable number of years. It sprang up when the Effutu  people departed from Western Sudan and journeyed to the present town of Winneba in the Central Region of Ghana. The came with  their god, known as Penkye Otu.

Neighborhoods 
Winneba has a number of neighborhoods stretching from the coastal areas to non-coastal areas. It also includes rural areas which provide farm power aside the fishing activity employed by the inhabitants of the coasts. Below are some of the well-known neighborhoods of Winneba.

Urban areas 

 Winneba Junction
 Lowcost
 Yepemso
 Nkwantanan
 Kundum
 Abasraba
 Girls-Ase
 Kojo-Beedu
 Gyatakrom
 Central Campus
 North Campus
 South Campus
 Zongo
 Sankor
 Water-works

Rural areas 

 Essuekyir
 Woarabeba
 Gyaahadze
 Osubonpanyin
 Ateitu
 Atakyedo
 Gyangyanadze
 Kookrom

Climate

Sister cities
List of sister cities of Winneba, designated by Sister Cities International:

Personalities
Alex Quaison-Sackey, Ghanaian diplomat
Mike Hammah, Former member of parliament for Effutu Municipal
 Honourable Alexander Kwamina Afenyo-Markin, current member of parliament for Effutu Municipal
Kojo Botsio, Ghanaian politician 
 Jacob Plange-Rhule, physician and academic

Notable Institutions 

 University of Education, Winneba
 Winneba Community Nursing Training College
 Winneba Senior High School
Winneba School of Business
 Winneba Vocational Training Institute
 Winneba Trauma and Specialist Hospital
 Winneba Fire Station

See also
 Aboakyer festival
Best Foods In Winneba

References

External links
 Ghana-pedia webpage - Winneba
	

Populated places in the Central Region (Ghana)